The 1900 Tulane Olive and Blue football team was an American football team that represented Tulane University as a member of the Southern Intercollegiate Athletic Association (SIAA) during the 1900 college football season. In their first year under head coach H. T. Summersgill, the team compiled an overall record of 5–0.

Schedule

Season summary

Southern A. C.
The season began with a 23–0 defeat of the Southern Athletic Club.

Alabama
Alabama lost 6–0 with the only points of the game coming on a one-yard Ellis Stearns touchdown run.

Millsaps
Tulane beat , 35–0.

LSU
Against rival LSU, Tulane won, 29–0.

Mississippi
Tulane beat Ole Miss, 12–0, having not allowed a single point all season.

References

Tulane
Tulane Green Wave football seasons
College football undefeated seasons
Tulane Olive and Blue football